Radulf de Lamley [Ralph, Ranulf, Randalph de Lambley] (died 1247) was a 13th-century monk and cleric. Radulf's youth is obscure, and it is not until the 1220s that he emerges in the sources as a Tironensian monk, now Abbot of Arbroath. He held the leadership of Arbroath Abbey until 1239, when he was chosen to succeed Gilbert de Stirling as Bishop of Aberdeen.

According to Hector Boece, he was selected purely on merit and maintained his ascetic life after becoming a bishop. This apparently included increasing the asceticism of the cathedral clergy, retaining the light diet of the monk and making his episcopal visitations on foot. Among the notable acts of his episcopate, he exempted the churches owned in corporation by the chapter from episcopal dues and confirmed the grants made by his predecessor bishops. He also excommunicated the murderers of Padraig, Earl of Atholl (d. 1241).

He died in the year 1247, sometime before 13 May when his successor Peter de Ramsay received a papal mandate for consecration.

References
 Dowden, John, The Bishops of Scotland, ed. J. Maitland Thomson, (Glasgow, 1912), pp. 103–4
 Innes, Cosmo, Registrum Episcopatus Aberdonensis: Ecclesie Cathedralis Aberdonensis Regesta Que Extant in Unum Collecta, Vol. 1, (Edinburgh, 1845), p. xxiii
 Keith, Robert, An Historical Catalogue of the Scottish Bishops: Down to the Year 1688, (London, 1924), p. 107
 Watt, D.E.R., Fasti Ecclesiae Scotinanae Medii Aevi ad annum 1638, 2nd Draft, (St Andrews, 1969), p. 1
 Watt, D.E.R. & Shead, N.F. (eds.), The Heads of Religious Houses in Scotland from the 12th to the 16th Centuries, The Scottish Records Society, New Series, Volume 24, (Edinburgh, 2001), p. 4

12th-century births
1247 deaths
Abbots of Arbroath
Bishops of Aberdeen
13th-century Scottish Roman Catholic bishops